The Last Detail is a 1973 American comedy-drama film directed by Hal Ashby, from a screenplay by Robert Towne, based on the 1970 novel of the same name by Darryl Ponicsan. The film stars Jack Nicholson, Otis Young, Randy Quaid, Clifton James, and Carol Kane. It follows two career sailors assigned to escort a young emotionally withdrawn recruit from their Virginia base to Portsmouth Naval Prison in Maine.

The Last Detail was theatrically released in the United States by Columbia Pictures on December 12, 1973. The film received positive reviews from critics, who praised the performances of Nicholson and Quaid, as well as Towne's screenplay. It was nominated for two Golden Globe Awards, three Academy Awards, and four British Academy Film Awards (winning two).

Plot
On Saturday, December 15, 1973, Navy lifers Signalman First Class Billy "Badass" Buddusky (Jack Nicholson) and Gunner's Mate First Class Richard "Mule" Mulhall (Otis Young) are awaiting orders in Norfolk, Virginia. They are assigned a shore patrol detail escorting 18-year-old Seaman Larry Meadows (Randy Quaid) to Portsmouth Naval Prison near Kittery, Maine. Meadows has been court-martialed, dishonorably discharged, and sentenced to eight years in the brig for stealing $40 from a charity fund run by the wife of a senior officer. Buddusky and Mulhall are given one week to escort Meadows to Portsmouth, and if they fail to complete the task on time or let Meadows go free, they will be kicked out of the Navy and lose all benefits and pay. Despite their initial resentment of the detail, and realizing their prisoner is a kleptomaniac who steals compulsively, Billy and Mule begin to like Meadows as they escort him on a train ride through the wintry northeastern states. They decide to show him a good time before delivering him to the authorities.

With several days to spare before they are due in Portsmouth, they make stops along their route to provide bon-voyage adventures for Meadows. In Washington, D.C., they go to a diner and order burgers, fries and milkshakes. Next they go to a bar, but they are denied drinks, as Meadows is underage and cannot provide ID. Instead they get drunk in an alley, missing their train, which forces them to stay overnight at a hotel, where they stay up all night watching TV and drinking. At the hotel, Buddusky teaches Meadows a few flag semaphore signals and tries to get the young prisoner to stick up for himself by provoking him into a fight. The next morning, they take a detour to Camden, New Jersey seeking Meadows' mother, only to find her away for the day and the house a pigsty, cluttered with empty liquor bottles. When they arrive at Grand Central Terminal in New York City, Buddusky instigates a fight with a group of Marines in a restroom, with Mulhall and Meadows eventually joining in. The older sailors later take Meadows ice skating at Rockefeller Center and go bar-hopping, where Buddusky gambles with their per diem money by playing darts with a group of bar patrons. They also encounter a group of Nichiren Buddhists chanting in an apartment building, who teach Meadows how to pray. The Buddhists invite the trio to a house party, where one of the members offers to help Meadows flee to Canada, but he declines out of loyalty to Buddusky and Mulhall. Buddusky also unsuccessfully tries to seduce a woman at the party, while Mulhall makes awkward conversation about serving in the Navy with the liberal party guests.

On the train to Boston the next morning, Buddusky and Mulhall decide to take the virginal Meadows to a whorehouse. While in Boston, they flag down a cab driver, who takes them to a seedy brothel. Meadows selects a young prostitute to lose his virginity to, while Buddusky and Mulhall wait in the hallway. After an aborted first attempt where he almost immediately ejaculates, Mulhall and Buddusky pay for Meadows to have a second chance with the prostitute. Buddusky and Mulhall make conversation while waiting for Meadows, where Buddusky reminisces about his former marriage and his life prior to the Navy. The next morning, Meadows tells the other sailors that despite her profession, he thinks the young prostitute might have had romantic feelings for him.

Just before they leave for Portsmouth, Meadows makes a final request for a picnic. The senior sailors buy some hot dogs and attempt a frigid barbecue in the snow at a local park, where Buddusky confides in Mulhall his concern for Meadows and the abuse that he will face at the hands of the Marines at the brig. Meadows suddenly bolts in a last-ditch effort to run away but slips on the ice and falls. Buddusky and Mulhall arrive, and Buddusky loses his temper and beats Meadows up, forcing Mulhall to restrain him.

Buddusky and Mulhall take Meadows into the prison where he is marched off to be processed without a word. Although Buddusky had worried about the brutality awaiting Meadows at the hands of the Marine guards, the young duty officer (a first lieutenant wearing an Annapolis ring), berates Buddusky and Mulhall for striking Meadows. He asks if Meadows tried to resist or fight, which they deny. The Marine also notices that their orders were never officially signed by the master-at-arms in Norfolk, meaning effectively they had not left. The angry young Marine officer relents when Mulhall and Buddusky ask to speak to the XO (Executive Officer). On the way out, Buddusky admonishes the officer for forgetting to keep his copy of the paperwork.

With the detail complete, the pair stride away from the prison complaining about the duty officer's incompetence. Both hope their orders will have come through when they get back to Norfolk.

Cast

 Jack Nicholson as Signalman 1st Class Billy L. "Badass" Buddusky
 Otis Young as Gunner's Mate 1st Class Richard "Mule" Mulhall
 Randy Quaid as Seaman Laurence M. "Larry" Meadows
 Clifton James as M.A.A.
 Carol Kane as Young Whore
 Michael Moriarty as First Lieutenant Marine Duty Officer
 Nancy Allen as Nancy
 Gilda Radner as Nichiren Shoshu Member
 Jim Hohn as Nichiren Shoshu Member
 Luana Anders as Donna

Production
Producer Gerry Ayres had bought the rights to Darryl Ponicsan's novel in 1969. After returning from the set of Drive, He Said, Robert Towne began adapting the novel. The screenwriter tailored the script for close friends Jack Nicholson and Rupert Crosse. In adapting the novel, Towne removed Buddusky's "closet intellectualism and his beautiful wife". The screenwriter also changed the ending so that Buddusky lives instead of dying as he does in the book. Ayres convinced Columbia Pictures to produce the film based on his consultant's credit on Bonnie & Clyde but had difficulty getting it made because of the studio's concern about the bad language in Towne's script. Peter Guber recalls, "The first seven minutes, there were 342 'fucks'". The head of Columbia asked Towne to reduce the number of curse words to which the writer responded, "This is the way people talk when they're powerless to act; they bitch". Towne refused to tone down the language and the project remained in limbo until Nicholson, by then a bankable star, got involved.

Ayres sent the script to Robert Altman and then Hal Ashby. Ayres remembers, "I thought that this was a picture that required a skewed perspective, and that's what Hal had". Ashby was coming off the disappointing commercial and critical failure of Harold and Maude and was in pre-production on Three Cornered Circle at MGM when Jack Nicholson told him about The Last Detail, his upcoming film at Columbia. The director had been sent the script in the fall of 1971, with a reader's report calling it "lengthy and unimaginative", but he personally found it very appealing.

He wanted to do it but it conflicted with his schedule for Three Cornered Circle. Ashby pulled out of his deal with MGM, and Nicholson suggested that they team up on Last Detail. Columbia did not like Ashby because he had a reputation of distrusting authority and made little effort to communicate with executives. The $2.3 million budget was low enough for him to get approved.

Casting
Nicholson was set to play Buddusky; additional casting focused mainly on the roles of Mule and Meadows. Bud Cort met with Ashby and begged to play Meadows, but the director felt that he was not right for the role. Robert Englund also auditioned for the role of Meadows. Casting director Lynn Stalmaster gave Ashby a final selection of actors, and the two that stood out were Randy Quaid and John Travolta. As originally written, the character of Meadows was a "helpless little guy", but Ashby wanted to cast Quaid, who was 6'4". He had offbeat and vulnerable qualities that Ashby wanted. Towne remembers thinking, "There's a real poignancy to this huge guy's helplessness that's great. I thought it was a fantastic choice, and I'd never thought of it."  Rupert Crosse was cast as Mule. Gilda Radner was cast in her first screen role, speaking one line as a member of Nichiren Shoshu.

Pre-production
The project stalled for 18 months while Nicholson made The King of Marvin Gardens. Guber told Ayres that he could get Burt Reynolds, Jim Brown, and David Cassidy and a new writer, and he would approve production immediately. Ayres rejected this proposal, and the studio agreed to wait because they were afraid that the producer would take the film to another studio. Ashby and Ayres read navy publications and interviewed current and ex-servicemen who helped them correct minor errors in the script. The director wanted to shoot on location at the naval base in Norfolk, Virginia, and the brig at Portsmouth, New Hampshire, but was unable to get permission from the United States Navy. However, the Canadian Navy was willing to cooperate and in mid-August 1972, Ashby and his casting director Stalmaster traveled to Toronto, Ontario to look at a naval base and meet with actors. The base suited their needs and Ashby met Carol Kane, whom he would cast in a small role. Opening scenes of the film were not shot at a Canadian Naval Base, but rather at CFB Borden, a major training base for the Canadian Air Force & Army.

Ashby was busted for possession of marijuana while scouting locations in Canada. This almost changed the studio's mind about backing the project, but the director's drug bust was not widely reported and Nicholson remained fiercely loyal to him, which was a deciding factor. Just as the film was about to go into production, Crosse was diagnosed with terminal cancer. Ashby postponed principal photography for a week to allow Crosse to deal with the news and decide if he still wanted to do the film. The actor decided not to do the film, and Ashby and Stalmaster scrambled to find a replacement. They cast Otis Young.

Principal photography
Ashby decided to shoot the film chronologically in order to help the inexperienced Quaid and recently cast Young ease into their characters. With the exception of Toronto doubling as Norfolk, the production shot on location, making the same journey as the three main characters. Early on, Quaid was very nervous and wanted to make a good impression. Ashby kept a close eye on the actor but allowed him to develop into the role. Haskell Wexler was supposed to shoot The Last Detail, but he could not get a union card for an East Coast production. Ashby asked Nestor Almendros and Gordon Willis but they were both unavailable.

The script originally called for the three sailors to cavort on the steps of the Supreme Court. But Chief Justice Warren E. Burger denied permission, reportedly in retalitaion for Nicholson's public criticism of Richard Nixon, who appointed Burger to his position.

Ashby promoted Michael Chapman, his camera operator on The Landlord, to director of photography. They worked together to create a specific look for the film that involved using natural light to create a realistic, documentary style. Ashby let Nicholson look through the camera's viewfinder as a shot was being set up so he knew the parameters of a given scene and how much freedom he had within the frame. The actor said, "Hal is the first director to let me go, to let me find my own level".

Post-production
The day after principal photography was completed, Ashby had his editor send what he had cut together so far. Ashby was shocked at the results and fired the editor, becoming afraid he would have to edit the film himself. Ayres recommended bringing in Robert C. Jones, one of the fastest editors in the business, who had been nominated for an Academy Award for Guess Who's Coming to Dinner. Jones put the film back into rushes and six weeks later had a first cut ready that ran four hours. Ashby was very impressed with his abilities and trusted him completely. Jones cut the film with Ashby at the filmmaker's home. The process took an unusually long time, as the director agonized over all the footage he had shot. Ashby would ignore phone calls from Columbia, and eventually executives higher and higher up the corporate ladder tried to contact him. Ashby was in London, meeting with Peter Sellers about doing Being There when he received a phone call from Jones, who told him that Columbia was fed up with the time it was taking for the film to be assembled. The head of the studio's editing department called Jones to say that a representative was coming to take the film. Jones refused to give up the film, and Ashby called the studio and managed to calm down the officials. Towne occasionally visited Ashby's house to check in and did not like the pacing of the film. According to Towne, Ashby "left his dramatizing to the editing room, and the effect was a thinning out of the script". During the editing process, Columbia hated the jump cuts Ashby employed. The studio was also concerned about the number of expletives. It needed a commercial hit as they were in major financial trouble. By August 1973, the final cut of The Last Detail was completed and submitted to the MPAA, which gave it an R rating.

Columbia was still not happy with the film and asked for 26 lines to be cut that had the word "fuck" in them. The theatrical release of The Last Detail was delayed for six months while Columbia fought over the profanity issue. The film contained 65 uses of "fuck" overall and at the time of its release, broke the record for most uses of the word in a motion picture. Ashby persuaded Columbia to let him preview the film to see how the public would react. It was shown in San Francisco, and the screening was a huge success.

Release
Ayres persuaded Columbia to submit The Last Detail to the Cannes Film Festival. After Nicholson won Best Actor there, it shamed the studio into releasing the film. The studio decided to give the film a limited release to qualify for Oscar consideration with a wide release planned for the spring of 1974. By the time of its wide release, any pre-Oscar hype that was generated was now gone.

Home media
It was initially released on VHS and Betamax videocassettes, and Laserdisc and Capacitance Electronic Disc (CED) Videodiscs, then later on DVD. Sony Pictures released The Last Detail on DVD in the United States on December 14, 1999. It was first made available on Blu-ray disc as a limited edition by boutique label Twilight Time in the United States on January 19, 2016 with two special features, an isolated score track and a theatrical trailer. The film was released in the UK by Powerhouse Films initially as a limited dual format edition set on February 27, 2017. Supplemental features include two cuts of the movie, original trailer; promotional materials; new interview with director of photography Michael Chapman; and a booklet.

Reception

Box office
The film opened at the Bruin Theater in Westwood, Los Angeles for a special 11-day Academy Award qualifying engagement where it grossed $46,369. It earned $5 million in rentals at the North American box office.

Critical response
The film received very positive reviews. In The New York Times, Vincent Canby said Nicholson's performance was "by far the best thing he's ever done". Variety magazine also praised Nicholson, saying he was "outstanding at the head of a superb cast". Gene Siskel of the Chicago Tribune gave the film four stars out of four, writing that Nicholson "continues his impressive string of performances" and that the screenplay "is both funny and wise. It captures all the silliness, stupidity, and veiled warmth of men in groups." He ranked it second (behind Day for Night) on his list of the best films of the year. Charles Champlin of the Los Angeles Times called it "a superior piece of film-making whose superlative acting, corrosive joking and dead-accurate feeling for time and milieu may well transcend its messages of hopelessness and innocence lost. But it is a downer, ferociously so." Gary Arnold of The Washington Post wrote in a generally negative review that "it's conceivable that this trim, foreshortened adaptation would have worked, if only the direction had been sharper. Unfortunately, Ashby has directed as if he were a novice, unsure of camera placement and lighting and undecided about what pace the story needs and what feelings it should evoke."
Andrew Sarris, however, praised Ashby's "sensitive, precise direction". Time magazine's Richard Schickel wrote: "There is an unpretentious realism in Towne's script, and director Ashby handles his camera with a simplicity reminiscent of the way American directors treated lower-depths material in the '30s".

It was shown as part of the Cannes Classics section of the 2013 Cannes Film Festival. Paul Tatara largely credits Towne's "profane, heartbreaking script" for the film's "small details, colorful language, and utterly believable character development, which cumulatively pack a real emotional wallop."

Awards and nominations
The Last Detail was nominated for the Palme d'Or at the 1974 Cannes Film Festival and Nicholson was awarded Best Actor. It was also nominated for three Academy Awards – Jack Nicholson for Best Actor in a Leading Role, Randy Quaid for Best Actor in a Supporting Role, and Robert Towne for Best Writing, Screenplay Based on Material from Another Medium with none of them winning. In addition, The Last Detail was nominated for two Golden Globes Awards – Nicholson for Best Motion Picture Actor – Drama and Quaid for Best Supporting Actor – Motion Picture. Nicholson also won a BAFTA award for his role in the film. Nicholson won the Best Actor awards from the National Society of Film Critics and the New York Film Critics Circle. However, he was disappointed that he failed to win an Oscar for his performance. "I like the idea of winning at Cannes with The Last Detail, but not getting our own Academy Award hurt real bad. I did it in that movie, that was my best role".

Unofficial sequel

In 2006, filmmaker Richard Linklater expressed an interest in adapting Last Flag Flying, a sequel to The Last Detail, into a film. In the novel, Buddusky runs a bar and is reunited with Larry Meadows after his son is killed in the Iraq War. Linklater's adaptation, which he co-wrote with Ponicsan, was released in November 2017 and stars Bryan Cranston, Laurence Fishburne, and Steve Carell.

Notes

See also
 List of American films of 1973

References
 Biskind, Peter (1998) Easy Riders, Raging Bulls. New York: Simon & Schuster.
 Dawson, Nick (2009) Being Hal Ashby. Lexington: University Press of Kentucky.
 Wiley, Mason and Damien Bona (1996) Inside Oscar. New York: Ballantine

Further reading
 "The Last Detail" by Richard Armstrong, Senses of Cinema, April 2003.
 "The Last Detail: Beyond the call of duty" by John and Judith Hess, Jump Cut, no. 2, 1974.

External links

 
 
 
 

1973 films
1970s buddy comedy-drama films
1970s road comedy-drama films
American buddy comedy-drama films
American road comedy-drama films
Columbia Pictures films
1970s English-language films
Films scored by Johnny Mandel
Films based on American novels
Films directed by Hal Ashby
Films set in Boston
Films set in New Hampshire
Films set in New York City
Films set in Virginia
Films set in Washington, D.C.
Military humor in film
Military of the United States in fiction
Films about the United States Navy
Films with screenplays by Robert Towne
1973 comedy films
1973 drama films
1970s American films